Shirley Angela Sherwood  (née Cross, born 1 July 1933) is a British writer, botanist and philanthropist.

Early life
She was born Shirley Cross. Sherwood was educated at St Anne's College, Oxford. She took a bachelor's degree in botany and a D.Phil. working on a project that led to tagamet.

Career
She is primarily a collector of, and author of books about, botanical illustrations. The Shirley Sherwood Gallery of Botanical Art,  opened on 19 April 2008, at Kew Gardens is named after her. It was the first gallery in the world dedicated solely to botanical art. Sherwood has been described as a "driving force behind a revival of interest in botanical art".

She is a vice-president of the Nature in Art Trust.

Honours
Sherwood was appointed Officer of the Order of the British Empire (OBE) in the 2012 New Year Honours for services to botanical art.

Personal life
In 1977, Sherwood married the businessman James Sherwood, who appeared in the 2004 Sunday Times Rich List.

Her sons, Simon and Charles, from her previous marriage adopted his surname.

Bibliography 
 The Art of Plant Evolution (2009), by Dr Shirley Sherwood and Dr W John Kress 
 Contemporary Botanical Artists: The Shirley Sherwood Collection (1996); 2nd edition 2003
A New Flowering: 1000 Years of Botanical Art (2005), by Shirley Sherwood, Stephen Harris & Barrie Edward Juniper
 Treasures of Botanical Art: Icons from the Shirley Sherwood and Kew Collections (2008), by Shirley Sherwood and Martyn Rix
 A Passion For Plants: Contemporary Botanical Masterworks from the Shirley Sherwood Collection (2001)
 Venice Simplon Orient-Express: The Return of the World's Most Celebrated Train (1983); 2nd edition 1985; 3rd edition 1990; 4th edition 1996
  Shirley A. M. Cross (1977) Localization of histamine and histamine H2-receptor antagonists in the gastric mucosa The Histochemical Journal 9 pages 619–644

See also
Florilegium

References

External links

Living people
British nature writers
British art collectors
Women art collectors
British botanists
British botanical writers
Women botanists
Royal Botanic Gardens, Kew
Officers of the Order of the British Empire
British women scientists
British women writers
Women science writers
1933 births